Charles Rutherford Kelly is a fictional character; one of the five main characters who appeared on the FX series sitcom It's Always Sunny in Philadelphia. Portrayed by Charlie Day, the character was created by Rob McElhenney, Glenn Howerton and Charlie Day and appears in all of the show's 162 episodes across 15 seasons. 

In the show, Charlie is co-owner at Paddy's (although he later sells his shares), the Irish Pub along with childhood friends Mac and Dennis. He is also Frank's roommate. He is addicted to various harmful substances (such as glue and alcohol), and is called illiterate by his peers ("The Gang Gives Back"). He also expresses deep interest in the law ("The Gang Exploits the Mortgage Crisis"), and shows proficiency at "bird law", managing to defeat The Lawyer in a trial ("McPoyle vs. Ponderosa: The Trial of the Century").

Character overview
Charlie is an easily excitable person who is prone to emotional outbursts and is often confused and flabbergasted by modern-day life. His anger management issues, substance abuse, poor hygiene, lack of common sense, illiteracy, and poor grasp of reality prevents him from achieving much success in life. He frequently abuses inhalants such as glue, spray paint and poppers and, like the rest of the Gang, is an alcoholic. 

Charlie's difficulty at reading and writing, generally poor communication skills, and poor grasp of grammar and syntax result in constant berating by the rest of the Gang. Described as having a "tenuous grasp of the English language in general", he is depicted as virtually unable to read or write, and keeps a personal journal consisting predominantly of childlike pictures in place of actual sentences. In one instance it was revealed that Charlie once signed his name (in blood) as "Chrundle", unable to even spell his own name. It is quite possible that Charlie has a lifelong case of severe, untreated dyslexia. Mac claims that "no one understands the subtleties of Charlie's retardation" better than he does. However, in season 15, it is revealed to Mac and the audience that, bizarrely, Charlie is both fluent and fully able to read and write in Irish, despite earnestly believing himself to have no ability to speak it. Like the rest of the Gang, Charlie has a poor grasp of history, current events, and geography, sometimes avoiding conversations on these subjects altogether to salvage some sense of dignity.

Despite his other difficulties, Charlie is something of a savant, displaying natural talent as a pianist (as well as harmonica and saxophone), music composer, playwright, choreographer, tailor, and hockey player, as well as being fluent in Irish. He is also very capable of devising intricate, Machiavellian schemes, manipulating other characters to his own ends. He particularly displays this when he seduces and manipulates a beautiful and wealthy girl named Ruby before insulting, rejecting, and humiliating her in front of a packed mansion of guests, merely because the Waitress finally acknowledged his presence in her life. He has also orchestrated elaborate schemes when given authority in the bar by Frank in "Mac Bangs Dennis's Mom", where he successfully convinces Dennis to humiliate himself sexually and get in a fight with Mac, and persuades Dee to give him favors and assistance in seducing the Waitress. Charlie's obsession with the Waitress fuels a surprising capacity for cruelty and manipulation.

Charlie is the only one of the Gang who displays any real work ethic, being the only one willing to take on less-desirable work around the bar, work referred to as "Charlie Work" by the rest of the Gang. In "Charlie Work", Charlie is the only one to show a true interest in passing the bar's routine health code inspection. In the various episodes where he and the Gang get jobs outside the bar, he tends to have the most hustle, even going as far as to uncover a major mail system conspiracy while working with Mac and Dennis in a mail room in "Sweet Dee Has a Heart Attack". In one of the scenes, he talks about receiving mail from an imagined character, Pepe Silvia, which later became a internet meme.

Description

Artistry
Charlie seems to be the most artistically talented member of The Gang, though his talents are rarely utilized by any of them. In "Pop-Pop: The Final Solution", he is depicted as having a moderate prowess as an artist by painting a German Shepherd Dog over an "original Hitler" painting. In "The Nightman Cometh", he demonstrates his abilities as a playwright, musical composer, and director by staging a dramatic musical production, the contents of which are seemingly about how he was molested as a child by his uncle Jack. He enjoys most forms of rock (modern and classic) and heavy metal, showing a particular interest in artists like Bob Dylan. When he, Frank, and Mac try to start a band in the episode "Sweet Dee's Dating a Retarded Person", Charlie dresses as Bob Dylan. He plays the piano quite well, and he demonstrates he has perfect pitch in "Charlie Work", exhibiting a natural musical talent; however, he fears rejection of his music or other creative ideas by others. Charlie's musical talents are a reflection of actor Charlie Day's real-life skill as a musician and songwriter. Like Dee, he sometimes suffers from stage fright and becomes nauseated when performing in front of live audiences, as in "Dennis Reynolds: An Erotic Life".

Travel
Early in the series, Charlie had a fear of leaving the city, claiming that he has never left Philadelphia in the episode "The Gang Hits the Road". (This contradicts the third-season episode "The Gang Gets Invincible", in which Charlie and the rest of the Gang spend most of the episode in Bucks County, just outside of Philadelphia, where he dresses as Green Man and trips on acid while Dennis, Mac, and Dee try out for the Philadelphia Eagles. Although Charlie does not seem to fully understand the concept of states and cities so he may have simply thought he was still in Philadelphia.) He finally leaves the Philadelphia area (for Atlantic City, New Jersey) in the episode "The Gang Gets Stranded in the Woods", after he convinces the gang to tie him up and put him in the trunk of a car. He also later returns to New Jersey to visit the Jersey Shore and, unlike Dee and Dennis, has a wonderful time there with The Waitress (who was high on ecstasy and deeply regretted her actions). In the episode "The Gang Beats Boggs", the gang takes a plane to Los Angeles purely so they could try to beat a drinking record set by Wade Boggs. Charlie's fear of leaving Philadelphia is never brought up again until "The Gang Goes to Hell", where he mentions how he used to only feel safe staying in Philadelphia but that he had been coerced by the rest of the Gang to visit different places, which is one of the reasons he and everyone else were on a sinking ship. Charlie and the Gang go skiing in season 11 and hit a waterpark in season 12. Charlie goes the farthest away from Philadelphia in season 15, where he went to Ireland.

Bizarre behavior
In the sixth-season episode "Charlie Kelly: King of the Rats", it is discovered that Charlie writes a dream book (or "Dram Bok", as he spells it) that is filled primarily with pictures and symbols (much like the ones he used to write the song "Night Man"). It is a crude collection of images and characters from his dreams. In "The Gang Gets Held Hostage", it is revealed that he has a "bad room" in the attic of the bar where he goes "to be alone and break bottles". Mac is convinced that anyone who encounters Charlie in his "bad room" is likely to be attacked.

It is mentioned multiple times throughout the series that Charlie and Frank play a game called 'Nightcrawlers' at night. While the rules of Nightcrawlers are never explained the 'game' appears to simply be Charlie and Frank crawling around on the floor of their shared apartment pretending to be worms (according to Dennis' interpretation). Charlie also plays this 'game' with his children in an animated fantasy in "The Gang Saves the Day" where he spells it as 'NYTE KROLLER'. The only time we see Nightcrawlers being played is during the final scene of "Being Frank" where Charlie drapes a blanket over himself and says "Darkness falls, and magic stirs as we become the creatures of the night!" before then throwing the blanket over Frank as the episode ends.

Charlie is also known for his bizarre thoughts, ideas, and aspirations. These include his favorite food being "milk steak" (steak boiled in milk and honey) boiled over hard with a side of "raw jellybeans", his fear of people's knees, his interest in ghouls and magnets, and his aforementioned dream book, which depicts surreal illustrations of what he sees in his dreams such as a "werm hat" (actually a German pilot named Hans Wermhatt), "denim chicken", and a "bird with teeth". He also tends to entirely miss the point of films; in "Mac and Charlie Write a Movie", it is revealed that he considers the "twist" at the end of The Sixth Sense to be that "the guy in the hairpiece was Bruce Willis the whole time." In the same episode, he and Mac agree that their film should star Dolph Lundgren, but Charlie believes that the character should be called "Dr. Dolph Lundgren" because he does not want to "confuse the audience" by giving the character a different name. In the episode "Thunder Gun 4: Maximum Cool", when the Gang are chosen to be the focus group in a test screening for the sequel to their favorite movie, Charlie spends the entire episode confused about basic storytelling techniques such as a setup and a plot twist.

Like the rest of the Gang, Charlie likes to dress in costumes and assume other personae, including the legendary "Green Man". In "The Aluminum Monster vs. Fatty McGoo", he shows a remarkable sewing ability, a skill that he claims allows him to maintain his few articles of clothing. Unlike the rest of the Gang, Charlie almost always wears the same few outfits, due to living in squalor. He is rarely seen without his signature green military jacket, black track jacket with red stripes, or gray MacGregor-brand hoodie. At home, he wears a worn black T-shirt depicting a shiny black horse and an old pair of long thermal underwear (described by Mac as being "covered in piss").

Charlie's childlike behavior also appears to affect his ability to create fantasies and remember memories. For the former Charlie only appears to fantasize about events in the style of a cartoon as shown in "The Gang Saves the Day" where he has a fantasy about saving, marrying (in a 'Marriage Store') and having children (whom he buys from a 'Baby Store') with The Waitress, all in the style of and in reference to the plot of the Pixar animated film "Up". In it he lives out a full life with The Waitress and their many children (who grow up to become janitors and waitresses and who also have incestuous relations and even children with each other) until The Waitress dies, after which Charlie fills his house with balloons allowing it to take off (exactly like in Up). For the latter Charlie believes that in order to remember a past event he must 'watch himself' as he acts out the memory as shown in "The Gang Does a Clip Show" where he also attempts to alter reality by 'remembering' a non-existent conversation he had with The Waitress in order to have a child with her. Similarly to the ending of "Inception", it left open-ended as to whether or not the Gang are in reality or in Charlie's 'memory' as we see him 'watch himself' as the episode ends, lingering on a shot of a continuously spinning spinning top.

Legal and monetary issues
Charlie seems convinced that he is an adept lawyer. This is shown by his interest in "bird law", Law & Order, and handling any legal matter that The Gang runs into. His delusion regarding his legal skill has caused him to repeatedly confront The Lawyer, a recurring enemy of the Gang in later seasons. He even went as far as to challenge The Lawyer to a duel. However, this belief is not entirely off-base; in the season 11 episode "McPoyle vs. Ponderosa: The Trial of the Century", Charlie's knowledge of bird law successfully solves the case, defeating the Lawyer.

Although Charlie is a co-owner of Paddy's, he lives in poverty and in many episodes is shown sleeping on the streets, scavenging for garbage (and eating it), and devising schemes to get others (namely Frank) to pay his rent. His financial problems are exacerbated by his tendency to make "bad investments."

Employment and physical durability
Many of the tedious and disgusting tasks at the pub (taking out the trash, cleaning the bathrooms, exterminating pests) are referred to as "Charlie Work", even when Charlie is not performing them. The pub's basement has a massive rat problem, and combating it is a nearly full-time job. Charlie has remarked that at times he has killed over 200 rats in a single night, but more always come back. Compared to the rest of the Gang, Charlie is ironically the only one with a more or less reliable work ethic who takes pride in his job, though his methods range from well meaning but incompetent (addressing high electricity prices by purchasing an even more expensive portable generator) to actually quite skilled (successfully managing to trick the health inspectors into giving the pub a passing grade). In contrast, the other members of the Gang either hate their jobs and scheme to get better ones (Dee and Dennis), are incompetent (Mac, a terrible bouncer who puts no effort into training), or are simply using the pub as a front for illegal activities (Frank).

Charlie seems almost inhumanly tough and resistant to injury. Mac and Dennis, who believe him to be nearly indestructible, frequently manipulate him into tests of his fortitude, such as hitting him over the head with beer bottles and chairs or having him tow Dennis' Range Rover through the streets of Philadelphia. After ingesting an amount of cough syrup large enough to "kill a gorilla", as Mac warns in "The Gang Dances Their Asses Off", Charlie simply states "Bro, I can handle my sedatives." He does in fact stay standing for several hours before collapsing, outlasting all but two other contestants. In the season three premiere, Charlie's mother reveals that he was the survivor of a failed abortion. He has on separate occasions been run over and grazed by a bullet fired by Dennis, yet shows no sign of permanent physical disability, nor exacerbation of his already questionable mental state. In "The World Series Defense", Charlie claims that he has thrown himself too many times in front of vehicles for the purpose of extorting their seat tickets and he has not suffered much damage after being run over by the car.

Relationships
Charlie has little to no success in dating but harbors an unrequited love for the Waitress, a recurring secondary character in the show. He goes to great lengths to attempt to win her over, despite her frequent declarations that she will never be interested in him. Charlie's attempts to woo the Waitress invariably end badly for her, as his actions have caused her to lose jobs and sleep with Frank and Dennis. Despite this, he seems to have had luck with other women, such as in the pilot "The Gang Gets Racist", where he begins dating a girl he met at a community center, only to be dumped when trying to use her to get a date with the Waitress. Another instance of Charlie having a stable girlfriend is in "Charlie and Dee Find Love", where he begins dating wealthy heiress Ruby Taft (Alexandra Daddario), who truly appreciates him for who he is. Unfortunately, Charlie ruins this relationship by revealing he was only using her to get closer to the Waitress. In "The Gang Misses the Boat", Charlie and Sweet Dee share an intimate night after an intense slam poetry session together, but by the following day refuse to even comment on the previous night's incident. Other instances throughout the series suggest that there may be veiled feelings between the two. However, in "Time's Up for the Gang", it's revealed Dee actually raped Charlie after he realised he didn't want to have sex with her, but she kept him pinned down and covered his mouth until she was finished. Charlie's genuine affection for the Waitress, twisted and sociopathic as it often is, has been cited by co-creator Glenn Howerton as an element that grounds The Gang's misadventures somewhat. Charlie did however manage to win over the Waitress in "Dennis' Double Life" where they both expressed their feelings together and ended up having sex, only for Charlie to realize she is not what he pictured her to be. This relationship ends when she cheats on Charlie with a sex doll of Dennis in "The Gang Makes Paddy's Great Again".

Morality
Charlie consistently shows more empathy than any other member of The Gang and seems to have slightly higher ethical standards. Despite his often firm sense of right-and-wrong, Charlie has few friends, depending largely on the selfish, unstable bonds formed within The Gang. It is revealed that Charlie never had a high social standing from childhood and, in high school, only gained any attention by engaging in disgusting acts (like eating worms or erasers), which earned him the nickname "dirt-grub". He has repeatedly claimed to have hated high school. Charlie's deeper understanding of right and wrong likely stems from a lifetime of mistreatment by other people. Charlie, unlike the rest of The Gang, also appears to have had a loving, if emotionally fragile, mother and a stable childhood (although it's revealed in "The Great Recession" that Charlie may have been molested by his uncle Jack.) Despite his morals, however, Charlie is not above selfishly manipulating, deceiving, and harming others for personal gain or vengeance. He enjoys seeing the other members of The Gang embarrassed or degraded, much like they often degrade him.

Family

The possibility that Frank Reynolds is Charlie's real father has been heavily hinted at throughout the series. Charlie finds out that Frank had a one-night stand with his mother, Bonnie, 30 years earlier, roughly at the same time as Charlie's conception. Charlie tries to persuade Frank to take a paternity test, but Frank adamantly refuses. Later, when his mother informs Charlie that he survived an abortion, she tells him that Frank is his father and pushed her to get the abortion, although Frank insists that Bonnie was known for being a "giant whore" and therefore maintains that he is not Charlie's father. The promiscuity of Charlie's mother is suggested more visibly in "A Very Sunny Christmas", where Charlie reminisces about numerous men dressed in Santa suits visiting his mother's bedroom on Christmas morning each year.

In "The Gang's Still in Ireland", it is revealed that Charlie's father is an Irish cheesemonger named Shelley Kelly. Having believed him to be a pen pal, Charlie grew up corresponding with Shelley at the behest of his mother. In "The Gang Carries a Corpse Up a Mountain", it is revealed Shelley died from fluid build-up in his lungs after Frank accidentally infected him with COVID-19. To honor his father's legacy and the Kelly family tradition, Charlie convinces the gang to help him carry Shelley up and throw him off a mountain. After some arguments, Charlie admits that he thought Shelley was "a deadbeat" and accepts the gang as his true family.

Though not explicitly stated, Charlie has teenage twin sisters who only appear in "Charlie Got Molested". Later in the episode, Charlie mentions one of his sisters while in the car with the McPoyle brothers, however, no further references are made to them in any following episodes.

Relationship with Frank
Frank and Charlie are very close, sharing an apartment and even the same bed. Their relationship is often mocked by the rest of The Gang, particularly the pair's shared embrace of filthy living conditions. They partner in many schemes and were even briefly domestic partners in Season Six. Frank's attachment to Charlie is shown to reach bizarre lengths in the episode "Mac and Charlie Die", where Frank seems to be the most affected by Charlie's death and carries around a mannequin that resembles Charlie. Frank is later witnessed "banging" the mannequin. However, Frank has readily betrayed Charlie on several occasions, manipulating him to gain access to women, including Charlie's beloved Waitress, and using Charlie's name and identity while engaged in illegal financial situations. When Charlie knew the hidden location of Frank's will (from which Charlie was to be the main beneficiary), Frank tried to have Charlie killed. Despite these many offenses against him, Charlie has remained largely devoted to Frank. In another episode, when Frank abandons Charlie and moves in with Bonnie, Charlie cooks an inedible dinner for The Gang and his parents and causes a string of violent arguments and hurt feelings just to get Frank to leave Bonnie and return to the apartment with him. A "weird connection" between Frank and Charlie is briefly mentioned in "CharDee MacDennis: The Game of Games", however, this is not mentioned throughout the rest of the show.

Green Man

Green Man is a persona assumed by Charlie wearing a green spandex suit in several episodes. The persona has spawned imitators, most notably at sporting events. Rob McElhenney adapted the idea after watching the Philadelphia Eagles defeat the Dallas Cowboys at Lincoln Financial Field. Without warning, in the parking lot after the game, a friend of McElhenney's stripped off his clothes and donned a full-body green spandex suit. McElhenney said: "Everyone started chanting, 'Green Man! Green Man!' It went on for several hours, and all I could think was, 'My God, there has to be a way I can take advantage of this on the show.'

When McElhenney returned to Los Angeles, he ordered a suit from Japan that was identical to the outfit that his friend had worn. The character made his debut in the episode "The Gang Gets Invincible", which centered on Mac, Dennis, and Dee trying out for the Eagles, just as they had seen in the film Invincible.

List of episodes featuring Green Man
 "The Gang Gets Invincible" (season 3)
 "America's Next Top Paddy's Billboard Model Contest" (season 4)
 "The World Series Defense" (season 5)
 "Charlie's Home Alone" and "The Gang Wins the Big Game" (season 13)

Reception
Paste ranked him No. 8 in their list of the 20 Best Characters of 2011, explaining: "In a cast full of douchebags, the childlike ball of energy played by Charlie Day comes off as more endearing than despicable. He's the personification of what makes It's Always Sunny in Philadelphia such a great show: perverse, loud, crude, and surprisingly likable." TV Guide listed him in their list of TV's Most Lovable Lunkheads.

References

Fictional Irish American people
Fictional alcohol abusers
Fictional blackmailers
Fictional characters from Philadelphia
Fictional characters with intellectual disability
Fictional drug addicts
Fictional stalkers
Fictional janitors
Fictional musicians
Fictional victims of child sexual abuse
It's Always Sunny in Philadelphia characters
Television characters introduced in 2005